The Chinatown of Yangon or so called Tayoke Tan lies west of the Sule Pagoda which is located in the centre of Downtown Yangon. 19th Street, Yangon is the main centre of the city's Chinatown.

Proceeding west along the Sule Pagoda Road, the 24th, 23rd, 22nd, 20th, 19th and 18th Streets and Bo Ywe, Latha and Sint Oh Dan Roads steaming with traffic are the busiest quarters of the city as it is in Chinatowns in other parts of the world. These roads fall under the Latha Township.

History
Yangon's Chinatown was created when the British expanded the city in the 1850s (the city was then known as Rangoon in Burma). It lies between Shwedaungtan Street on the west and Shwedagon Pagoda Road on the east. The northern and southern borders are the Maha Bandoola Road and the Strand Road.

References

Yangon
Chinatowns in Asia